Atractus pantostictus is a species of snake in the family Colubridae.

The common name for this species in Portuguese is cobra-da-terra or fura-terra.

The species can be found in south eastern part of Brazil. One study found the species occurring in rainforests.

References 

Atractus
Snakes of South America